Rio Santiago may refer to:

Río Santiago (Puerto Rico), a river of Puerto Rico
Río Santiago District, a district in Peru
Río Santiago Shipyard in Buenos Aires, Argentina
Río Grande de Santiago, a river in Mexico